"I Wish" is a song by English DJ Joel Corry featuring English singer Mabel, released on 29 October 2021. The song peaked at number 17 on the UK Singles Chart, became Joel Corry's sixth and Mabel's eleventh top-20 hit. "I Wish" is also featured as a bonus track on the streaming edition of Mabel's second studio album About Last Night… (2022).

Track listing

Charts

Weekly charts

Year-end charts

Certifications

References

2021 singles
2021 songs
Joel Corry songs
Mabel (singer) songs
Songs written by Mabel (singer)
Songs written by Jess Glynne
Songs written by MNEK